Muki Batali is a South Sudanese politician. He has served as Commissioner of Kajo-Keji County, Central Equatoria since 2005.

References

Living people
County Commissioners of South Sudan
Year of birth missing (living people)
People from Central Equatoria
Place of birth missing (living people)
21st-century South Sudanese politicians